Acandí is a town in Colombia at the northern extremity of the department of Chocó in the northwest of Colombia, bordering Panama and the Caribbean Sea. It was founded around the year 1887, and it became a municipality in 1905, previously being part of Turbo. The name "Acandí" is a corruption of the indigenous word "Acanti", which means "River of Stone".

It is one of the constituent territories of the region of Darién, together with the towns of Unguía, Juradó and the municipality of Riosucio west of the Atrato river.

Acandí has no road connection with the outside world. It is only about 5 miles (8 km.) from the Panama border. This is the route for everything in Acandí that does not arrive by air. In the years leading up to the Haitian migrant crisis of 2021, these ferries, running at capacity, were primarily transporting Haitians, who were about to enter the Panamanian Darién Gap en route to the United States.

History
The name Acandí is derived from the Acandí tribe which means "River of Stones". The first the town of Acandí was founded in c. 1890 by Spanish settlers Concepción Gómez, Fermín Ávila, José Piestán, José Garrido and others with the name of San Nicolás de Titumate and was located at the western shore of the Acandí River but was constantly flooded and devastated by this river. The inhabitants moved the village to its current safer location in 1896.

The municipality of Acandí was created on August 5, 1908, by an ordinance of the same year.

Geography

Climate
Acandí has a wet tropical rainforest climate (Köppen Af).

Economy
The main economic activities of Acandí are agriculture, livestock raising, artisan fishing and informal commerce. The main agricultural products are maize, plantain and yuca. The municipality also covers the tourism hub Capurganá, located near the border with Panama.

Transportation
Acandí has a small seaport on the Caribbean Sea mainly utilizing it to communicate with other nearby ports in Colombia and Panama. The Atrato River is also used for transportation and a way to reach the Departmental capital Quibdó. The town also has a small airport, Alcides Fernández Airport (Airport class G. 1,200 m long, 10 m wide) that can receive light planes and is used primarily to fly to Quibdó or towns in the Antioquia Department. It is owned by the Colombian government agency INCORA.

Inhabitants also use the nearby airfields in Capurganá:
Capurganá Airport – Airport class F. in the police inspection of Capurganá. 852 m long, 12 m wide and operated by the municipality.
El Gilcal Airport – Airport class G. 500 m long, 15 m wide and owned by the municipality.

References

Municipalities of Chocó Department
Populated places established in 1887
Colombia–Panama border crossings
Road-inaccessible communities of Colombia